The Ikhwan raid on Busayya in Iraq occurred on 5 November 1927. Elements of the Ikhwan, mainly consisting of the Mutayr tribe under Faisal al-Duwaish, raided southern Iraq, clashing with Iraqi troops near Al Busayya, resulting in some 20 casualties on both sides. This attack later became known as the beginning of the Ikhwan rebellion.

Aftermath
Ikhwan tribesmen also raided Kuwait in January 1928. On both occasions (raids on Iraq and Kuwait) they looted camels and sheep, and though they raided brutally, they suffered heavy retaliations from the Royal Air Force and Kuwaitis.

See also
Ikhwan raids on Transjordan
List of modern conflicts in the Middle East

References

1927 in Asia
Battles involving Saudi Arabia
Conflicts in 1927